Boavista Futebol Clube is an amateur futsal team based in Porto, Portugal. It plays in Portuguese Futsal First Division.

Honours
International
European Futsal Cup Winners Cup:
Runner-up (1): 2005–06

National
Taça de Portugal de Futsal:
Runner-up (1): 2004–05
SuperTaça de Futsal de Portugal:
Winner (1): 2005

External links
 www.boavistafutsal.com

Boavista F.C.
Futsal clubs in Portugal